WEPM is a News/Talk/Sports formatted broadcast radio station licensed to Martinsburg, West Virginia, serving the Eastern Panhandle of West Virginia. WEPM is owned and operated by John and David Raese, through licensee West Virginia Radio Corporation of the Alleghenies.

History
Owner C. Leslie Golliday, a prominent Martinsburg businessman, envisioned a group of stations in the state, and his early announcers used the tag line, "This is the Mountaineer station for the Eastern Panhandle," thus the call sign there of WEPM. Another suggested meaning for EPM is "Eastern Panhandle, Martinsburg."

Golliday also owned WCLG in Morgantown, WV which carried a similar tag line, "This is the Mountaineer station for northern West Virginia."

Golliday died in late June, 2007 at the age of 92.

Sale
On October 31, 2014, Prettyman Broadcasting announced the sale of WEPM to West Virginia Radio Corporation (WVRC) for an unknown sum. Included in the same are sister stations WICL and WLTF. WVRC assumed control of the stations, through a Local marketing agreement, on November 1. The purchase was consummated on February 13, 2015, at a price of $3 million.

Translator
In addition to the main station, WEPM is relayed by an FM translator to widen its broadcast area.

References

External links
 The Panhandle News Network Online
 

1946 establishments in Virginia
News and talk radio stations in the United States
Sports radio stations in the United States
ESPN Radio stations
Radio stations established in 1946
EPM
Martinsburg, West Virginia